Cristian Andres Palomeque Valoyes (born 2 April 1994) is a Colombian footballer who plays for Mushuc Runa.

Club career

Alianza Petrolera

2012
Palomeque made his debut for Alianza Petrolera on 20 October as a starter, scoring a goal in a 2–1 victory against Universitario Popayán for the 2012 Categoría Primera B. He made his second season appearance against América de Cali, netting a double in a 4–1 triumph at the  Pascual Guerrero just nine days later. On 4 November, he scored against Atlético Bucaramanga in a 1–0 victory. Palomeque would score against Bucaramanga once more, this time in a 2–0 home win. In a decisive match against Deportivo Rionegro, Palomeque scored the second goal in a 3–1 victory, thus allowing Petrolera to dispute the promotion play-off against América de Cali.

Despite having only played a handful of games, Palomeque's goal scoring abilities became an important factor for Petrolera as they reached their most important moment in history. In the first leg of the final, Palomeque netted what would be his most vital goal yet, helping Petrolera top América 2–1. Him along with his team, failed to find the net in the second leg, with América eventually tying up the series at 2-2. However, he still managed to score in the penalty shoot-out which Petrolera remarkably won 4–3, therefore being promoted.

2013
After taking part in the Colombian team that won the 2013 South American Youth Championship, Palomeque made his first appearance in the Categoría Primera A against Atlético Nacional. On 20 April, Palomeque scored his first top division goal from a free kick in a 2–2 draw against Deportivo Cali. He successfully converted a goal from the penalty spot on 12 May against Cúcuta Deportivo. Petrolera, however, lost the match 2–3. Against Atlético Huila, Palomeque scored the sole goal in 1–0 victory.

Honours

Club
Alianza Petrolera
 Categoría Primera B: 2012

Colombia
South American Youth Championship: 2013

References

External links

1994 births
Living people
Colombian footballers
Colombian expatriate footballers
Categoría Primera A players
North American Soccer League players
Atlético Nacional footballers
Alianza Petrolera players
Once Caldas footballers
La Equidad footballers
San Antonio Scorpions players
Colombia youth international footballers
Colombia under-20 international footballers
Expatriate soccer players in the United States
Association football midfielders
Sportspeople from Antioquia Department